After the invasion of the Philippines by the Japanese in 1941, several Americans, civilian and military, evaded capture or escaped imprisonment.  This occurred on several islands in the archipelago.  With the aid of the local Philippine population, these Americans survived.  However, not content with just surviving and avoiding capture, these Americans formed resistance groups, which were soon recognized by the American military, and eventually supplied.  Initially relegated to an intelligence gathering role, these groups eventually took a more active and aggressive role, such that they were an integral part of the American re-conquest of the country.

Member list

Notes

Bibliography

 Bataan Diary .
 Bataan Diary, 121st Infantry Regiment .
 Breuer, William, MacArthur's Undercover War, Hoboken, New Jersey: Castle, 1995.
 Decker, Malcolm, From Bataan to Safety: the rescue of 104 American soldiers in the Philippines, McFarland, 2008. .
 Guardia, Mike, American Guerrilla: the forgotten heroics of Russell W. Volckmann, Havertown, Pennsylvania / Newbury, England: Casemate, 2010. . .
 Guardia, Mike, Shadow Commander: the epic story of Donald D. Blackburn, Havertown, Pennsylvania / Newbury, England: Casemate, 2011.
 Guerrilla Activities in the Philippines  
 Guerrilla Days in North Luzon, US Army Forces in the Philippines, North Luzon, 1946.
 Guerrilla Resistance Movement in Northern Luzon, Quezon City: Office of Military History, Armed Forces of the Philippines.
 "Guerrillas in the Philippines", 
 Harkins, Philip, Blackburn's Headhunters, New York: W.W. Norton, 1955.
 Keats, John, They Fought Alone: a true story of a modern American hero, Philadelphia: J.B. Lippincott, 1963.
 Lapham, Robert & Bernard Norling, 1996, Lapham's Raiders: guerrillas in the Philippines, 1942-1945, Lexington: University Press of Kentucky.
 Milligan, Denny, Lest We Forget: the brave and honorable guerrillas and Philippine Scouts of WW II.
 Mills, Scott, Stranded in the Philippines: Professor Bell's private war against the Japanese, Naval Institute Press, 2009. .
 Norling, Bernard, 1999, The Intrepid Guerrillas of North Luzon, Lexington: University Press of Kentucky. 
 Ramsey, Edwin Price & Stephen Rivele, 1990, Lieutenant Ramsey's War: from horse soldier to guerrilla commander, New York: Knightsbridge, 1990; Washington, DC: Potomac Books, 1990; Washington: Brassey's, 1996. .
 Richardson, Hal, One-Man War: the Jock McLaren story, Sydney: Angus and Robertson, 1957.
 Schaefer, Chris, Bataan Diary: an American family in World War II, 1941-1945, Houston: Riverview Publishing, 2004. .
 Schmidt, Larry, American Involvement in the Filipino Resistance Movement on Mindanao During the Japanese Occupation, 1942-1945, MMAS thesis, Fort Leavenworth, Kansas: US Army Command and General Staff College, 1982. 
 Segura, Manuel, Tabunan: The Untold Exploits of the Famed Cebu Guerrillas in World War II.
 Sinclair, Peter Thomas, Men of Destiny: the American and Filipino guerrillas during the Japanese occupation of the Philippines, School of Advanced Military Studies, US Army. 
 Special Operations in the Pacific 
 Spencer, Louise Reid, Guerrilla Wife, New York, Thomas Y. Crowell, 1945.
 St. John, Joseph, Leyte Calling, New York: Vanguard, 1945.
 Utinsky, Margaret, "Miss U", San Antonio: Naylor, 1948.
 Volckmann, Russell William, We Remained: three years behind the enemy lines in the Philippines, New York: W. W. Norton, 1954.
 Whitehead, Arthur Kendal, Odyssey of a Philippine Scout, Bedford, Pennsylvania: Aberjona, Aegis. 
 Willoughby, Charles Andrew, The Guerrilla Resistance Movement in the Philippines, 1941-1945, New York: Vantage, 1972.
 Wise, William, Secret Mission to the Philippines, E.P. Dutton, 1968; iUniverse, 2001. 

American people of World War II
Military history of the Philippines during World War II
South West Pacific theatre of World War II